Mark Fawcett may refer to:
 Mark Fawcett (canoeist)
 Mark Fawcett (snowboarder)